The 2006 Sky Bet World Grand Prix was the ninth staging of the World Grand Prix darts tournament, organised by the Professional Darts Corporation. It was held at the Citywest Hotel, Dublin, Ireland, between 23–29 October 2006.

The top 24 players in the PDC world rankings were joined by four players from a field of 348 at the All Ireland Qualifiers and four players from a field of 127 at the PDPA Qualifiers. Phil Taylor won the event – his seventh Grand Prix title.

How They Qualified

Automatic Qualifiers
The top 24 players in the PDC rankings secured their place at the 2006 World Grand Prix automatically. Colin Lloyd as world number one at the time of the cut-off date of 11 September took his place as top seed.

All Ireland Qualifiers
The Fairways Hotel in Dundalk played host to the All-Ireland qualifying event on 17 September. Out of a field of 348 players from Ireland, four qualified to play in the World Grand Prix. The top three ranked players - John MaGowan, Tom Kirby and Mick McGowan all failed to reach the final stages. Three of the qualifiers will be making their Grand Prix debuts, with only Paul Watton having previously appeared.

Anto McCracken, Dublin
Garrett Gray, Dublin
Geoffrey Matthews, Ballymena
Paul Watton, Coleraine

PDPA Qualifiers
The Professional Dart Players Association (PDPA) qualifying event was held at the Newport Centre on 22 September. Out of a field of 127 players, four players qualified to complete the line up for the Grand Prix. Raymond van Barneveld, Steve Beaton, Alan Green and Andy Callaby were the successful players.

Prize fund
Following the announcement in October 2006 of the extension of Skybet's sponsorship contract, the prize fund was increased to £130,000.

Seeds

Draw

References

External links
 Pictures from the 2006 World Grand Prix Darts tournament

World Grand Prix (darts)
World Grand Prix Darts